Two ships have been named HMS Ameer:
 , a  sent to the British Royal Navy under Lend-Lease.
Sank with catastrophic loss of life on 24 November 1943.

Royal Navy ship names